A Lutheran chorale is a musical setting of a Lutheran hymn, intended to be sung by a congregation in a German Protestant Church service. The typical four-part setting of a chorale, in which the sopranos (and the congregation) sing the melody along with three lower voices, is known as a chorale harmonization.

Lutheran hymns

Starting in 1523, Martin Luther began translating worship texts into German from the Latin. He composed melodies for some hymns himself, such as "Ein feste Burg ist unser Gott" ("A Mighty Fortress Is Our God"), and even a few harmonized settings. For other hymns he adapted Gregorian chant melodies used in Catholic worship to fit new German texts, sometimes using the same melody more than once. For example, he fitted the melody of the hymn "Veni redemptor gentium" to three different texts, "Verleih uns Frieden gnädiglich", "Erhalt uns, Herr, bei deinem Wort", and "Nun komm, der Heiden Heiland". The first Lutheran hymns were published in 1524.

Luther and his contemporaries referred to these vernacular hymns as geistliche Lieder (spiritual songs), Psalmen (psalms), christliche Lieder (Christian songs), and geistliche (or christliche) Gesänge or Kirchengesänge. The German word Choral, which was originally used to describe Latin plainchant melodies, was first applied to the Lutheran hymn only in the later sixteenth century.

In the modern era, many Lutheran hymns are used in Protestant worship, sometimes sung in four-part harmony.

Composers

Composers of tunes for Lutheran hymns, or who adopted such tunes in their compositions:
 Martin Luther (1483–1546)
 Johann Walter (1496–1570)
 Sebald Heyden (1499–1561)
 Nikolaus Herman (–1561)
 Johannes Hermann (1515–1593)
 Nikolaus Selnecker (1530–1592)
 Cyriakus Schneegass (1546–1597)
 Joachim a Burck (1546–1610)
 Philipp Nicolai (1556–1608)
 Bartholomäus Gesius (–1613)
 Michael Praetorius (1571–1621)
 Melchior Franck (–1639)
 Melchior Teschner (1584–1635)
 Michael Altenburg (1584–1640)
 Heinrich Schütz (1585–1672)
 Johann Hermann Schein (1586–1630)
 Samuel Scheidt (1587–1654)
 Johann Schop (–1667)
 Heinrich Scheidemann (–1663)
 Johann Crüger (1598–1662)
 Andreas Hammerschmidt (1611/1612–1675)
 Dieterich Buxtehude (–1707)
 Gottfried Vopelius (1645–1715)
 Johann Pachelbel (1653–1706)
 Johann Sebastian Bach (1685–1750) harmonised hundreds of chorales, typically used at the end of his cantatas and concluding scenes in his Passions. In his St Matthew Passion, he set five stanzas of "O Haupt voll Blut und Wunden" in four different ways. He also used hymns as the base for his cycle of chorale cantatas and chorale preludes. Bach concentrated on the chorales especially in the Chorale cantatas of his second annual cycle, composed mostly in 1724/25.
 Felix Mendelssohn (1809–1847)
 Anton Bruckner (1824–1896).
 Johannes Brahms (1833–1897)
 Max Reger (1873–1916)
 Sigfrid Karg-Elert (1877–1933)
 Igor Stravinsky (1882–1971)
 Ernst Pepping (1901–1981)
 Hugo Distler (1908–1942)
 Sofia Gubaidulina (b. 1931)
 George C. Baker (b. 1951)

Compositions based on Lutheran chorales

Vocal

Organ

Chorales also appear in chorale preludes, pieces generally for organ originally designed to be played immediately before the congregational singing of the hymn, but developed into an autonomous genre by north-German composers of the middle and late 17th century, particularly Dieterich Buxtehude. A chorale prelude includes the melody of the chorale, and adds contrapuntal lines. One of the first composers to write chorale preludes was Samuel Scheidt. Bach's many chorale preludes are the best-known examples of the form. Later composers of the chorale prelude include Johannes Brahms, for example in his Eleven Chorale Preludes, and Max Reger who composed many examples, including Wie schön leucht' uns der Morgenstern (based on the hymn by Philipp Nicolai). In the 20th century, important contributions to the genre were made by Hugo Distler and Ernst Pepping.

Other instrumental
Sofia Gubaidulina – Meditation über den Bach-Choral "Vor deinen Thron tret' ich hiermit", for harpsichord, two violins, viola, cello, and contrabass (1993)

Scholarship

Scholarship regarding Lutheran chorales intensified from the 19th century.

Carl von Winterfeld
The musicologist Carl von Winterfeld published three volumes of Der evangelische Kirchengesang und sein Verhältniss zur Kunst des Tonsatzes (Evangelical church-song and its relation to the art of composition) from 1843 to 1847.

Zahn's classification of chorale tunes
Johannes Zahn published Die Melodien der deutschen evangelischen Kirchenlieder (the tunes of the German Evangelical hymns) in six volumes from 1889 to 1893.

References

Sources 
 
 
 
 
 
 
 
I (1843): Der Evangelische Kirchengesang im ersten Jahrhunderte der Kirchenverbesserung (first centuries of the reformation)
II (1845): Der Evangelische Kirchengesang im siebzehnten Jahrhunderte (17th century)
III (1847): Der Evangelische Kirchengesang im achtzehnten Jahrhunderte (18th century)
 
I (1889): Zweizeilige bis fünfzeilige Melodien (melodies in two to five lines), Nos. 1–2047
II (1890): Sechszeilige Melodien (melodies in six lines), Nos. 2048–4216
III (1890): Die siebenzeiligen und jambischen achtzeiligen Melodien (melodies in seven and eight iambic lines), Nos. 4217–6231
IV (1891): Die Melodien von den achtzeiligen trochäischen bis zu den zehnzeiligen inkl. enthaltend (melodies in eight trochaic up to and including ten lines), Nos. 6232–8087
V (1892): Die übrigen Melodien von den elfzeiligen an, nebst Anhang und Nachlese, sowie das chronologische Verzeichnis der Erfinder von Melodien und alphabetische Register der Melodien (the other melodies of eleven lines and more, with an annex and complement, and also a chronological index of composers of melodies and an alphabetical register of melodies), Nos.8088–8806
VI (1893): Schlüßband: Chronologisches Verzeichnis der benutzten Gesang-, Melodien- und Choralbücher, und die letzten Nachträge (closing volume: chronological catalogue of used song-, melody- and choirbooks, and the last supplements)

Further reading

External links

 Chorale discussion by Bernard Greenberg in the J. S. Bach FAQ (archived copy)
 Complete sets of all four-part Bach chorale settings in MIDI or QuickTime format
 American Choral Music, 1870–1923, LoC
 ChoraleGUIDE – help with Bach chorale harmonization
 The Chorales of Bach's St. Matthew Passion

16th-century music genres
18th-century music genres
Protestant hymnology
Lutheran liturgy and worship
Church music